The 2017 Conference USA women's soccer tournament was the postseason women's soccer tournament for Conference USA held from November 1 through 5, 2017. The seven-match tournament took place at FAU Soccer Stadium in Boca Raton, Florida. The eight-team single-elimination tournament consisted of three rounds based on seeding from regular season conference play. The defending champions were the Charlotte 49ers, but they failed to defend their title after losing the penalty shoot-out tiebreaking procedure in the final following a tie with the North Texas Mean Green. The conference championship was the second for the North Texas women's soccer program, both of which have come under the direction of head coach John Hedlund.

Bracket

Schedule

Quarterfinals

Semifinals

Final

Statistics

Goalscorers 

3 Goals
 Taylor Torres - North Texas

2 Goals
 Martha Thomas - Charlotte

1 Goal
 Iris Achterhof - Old Dominion
 Asta Arnadottir - Florida Atlantic
 Jenna Dages - Louisiana Tech
 Ariel Diaz - North Texas
 Taylor Hatch - Middle Tennessee
 Nomvula Kgoale - Louisiana Tech
 Brooke Lampe - North Texas
 Aaliyah Nolan - North Texas

See also 
 2017 Conference USA Men's Soccer Tournament

References 

Conference USA Women's Soccer Tournament
2017 Conference USA women's soccer season